Nattalin  is a township in Tharrawaddy District in the Bago Region of Burma. The principal town is Nattalin.

References

Townships of the Bago Region
Pyay District